Mikhail Yefimovich Krichevsky (25 February 1897?, Karlovka, Poltava Governorate, Russian Empire – 26 December 2008, Donetsk, Donetsk Oblast, Ukraine) was a Jewish-Ukrainian supercentenarian and the last surviving World War I veteran who fought for the Russian Empire. Krichevsky was mobilized into the Imperial Russian Army in 1917 and was sent to the Southwestern Front, after graduating from the Kiev Military Engineering School as an engineer-praporshchik. After the October Revolution he returned home, where he settled and lived in Donetsk and died in 2008 at the claimed age of 111 years old.

See also
List of last surviving World War I veterans

References

2008 deaths
Russian military personnel of World War I
Ukrainian centenarians
Dnipro Polytechnic alumni
Recipients of the Order of the Red Banner of Labour
People from Poltava Oblast
People from Poltava Governorate
Jews from the Russian Empire
Ukrainian Jews
Soviet Jews
Ukrainian people of World War I
Longevity claims
1890s births